Killam is a town in central Alberta, Canada. It is located in Flagstaff County, east of Camrose at the junction of Highway 13 and Veterans Memorial Highway, Highway 36. Killam is located in a rich agricultural area and is a local hub for trade. It is considered the agricultural hub of Flagstaff County.

Demographics 

In the 2016 Census of Population conducted by Statistics Canada, the Town of Killam recorded a population of 989 living in 380 of its 415 total private dwellings, a  change from its 2011 population of 981.

Government 
The mayor of Killam is Ben Kellert.

Notable people 
Kevin Martin, curling champion and Olympic gold medalist
Kevin Sorenson, Canadian Member of Parliament
Bill Peters, former NHL coach

See also 
List of communities in Alberta
List of towns in Alberta

References

External links 

1906 establishments in Alberta
Towns in Alberta